The Midland Beach Railway Company was the operator of a miniature railway at Midland Beach in Staten Island, New York City around 1903. The railroad operated along a pier jutting out from what is now the South Beach Boardwalk.

Operation 
The gauge of the locomotive was a unique , and it was built like a standard trunk line steam locomotive in every particular.

Locomotive 
The lilliputian locomotive was made by the Miniature Railway Company of New York. Their devices have proved profitable at street railway parks as well as at some of the fairs, like the Pan-American Exposition, at Buffalo, New York, and those at Omaha, Philadelphia and Charleston in the early 1900s. Some of the street railway parks at which these machines have been run in 1902 were those of the Oil City Railway Company, Oil City, Pennsylvania; the West Chicago Street Railway Company and the Richmond Beach Railway Company.

References 

Companies based in Staten Island
Defunct New York (state) railroads
Narrow gauge railroads in New York (state)
12⅝ in gauge railways